Aloka may refer to the following notable people:
Given name
Aloka Amarasiri (born 1989), Sri Lankan cricketer 
Āloka David Smith (1946–2015), British Buddhist practitioner 
Aloka McLean (born 1981), Canadian actress

Surname
Sachith Aloka, Sri Lankan football forward

Sinhalese masculine given names
Sinhalese surnames